Tegan Fourie (born 13 July 1998) is a South African field hockey player for the South African national team.

International career
She made her début in South Africa Under-21 it 2016 at Junior Africa cup and Junior World Cup.

In 2017, Fourie made her indoor debut during a test series against Zimbabwe. She has gone on to represent the team in various test matches, as well as at the 2021 Indoor Africa Cup.

Despite never having made an international outdoor appearance, Fourie was named to the South Africa squad for the test matches Namibia. She was named to the South Africa squad for the Hockey Africa Cup of Nations for Ghana

Personal life
Fourie is a type 1 diabetic.

She attended is St Mary’s DSG, Kloof and studied at the University of Pretoria.

His sister  also is an international hockey player at Junior Africa cup.

Honours

Indoor
 Test Matches: RSA v ZIM (2017)  - Leading Goalscorer
 Test Matches: CZE v RSA (2019)  - Leading Goalscorer
 Indoor Africa Cup 2021 - Leading Goalscorer

References

External links

South African female field hockey players
Living people
1998 births
People with type 1 diabetes
TuksHockey Club players
2023 FIH Indoor Hockey World Cup players